Epicauta is a genus of beetles in the blister beetle family, Meloidae. The genus was first scientifically described in 1834 by Pierre François Marie Auguste Dejean. Epicauta is distributed nearly worldwide, with species native to all continents except Australia and Antarctica. Surveys have found the genus to be particularly diverse in northern Arizona in the United States. Few species occur in the Arctic, with none farther north than the southern Northwest Territory of Canada.

Adult beetles feed on plants. The larvae are predators on the eggs of grasshoppers. The beetles can significantly damage plants, and many Epicauta are known as agricultural pests around the world, even known to cause crop failures at times. As do other blister beetles, these produce cantharidin, a toxic terpenoid which can kill animals such as horses if they ingest enough of the beetles.

This is one of the largest blister beetle genera, with about 360 described species as of 2011.

Species

 Epicauta abadona Skinner, 1904
 Epicauta abeona Pinto, 1980
 Epicauta adspersa (Klug, 1825)
 Epicauta aemula (Fischer, 1827)
 Epicauta aethiops (Latreille, 1827)
 Epicauta afoveata Werner, 1949
 Epicauta alastor Skinner, 1904
 Epicauta albida (Say, 1824)
 Epicauta albolineata (Dugès, 1877)
 Epicauta albomarginata Mäklin, 1875
 Epicauta albovittata Gestro, 1878
 Epicauta alphonsii Horn, 1874
 Epicauta alpina Werner, 1944
 Epicauta ambusta (Pallas, 1781)
 Epicauta andersoni Werner, 1944
 Epicauta annulicornis Chevrolat, 1877
 Epicauta anthracina (Erichson, 1848)
 Epicauta apache Pinto, 1980
 Epicauta apicalis Dugès, 1889
 Epicauta apicipennis Tan, 1958
 Epicauta aptera Kaszab, 1952
 Epicauta apure Adams & Selander, 1979
 Epicauta aragua Adams & Selander, 1979
 Epicauta ardosia Fairmaire, 1896
 Epicauta arizonica Werner, 1944
 Epicauta aspera Werner, 1944
 Epicauta assamensis (Waterhouse, 1871)
 Epicauta assimilis (Haag-Rutenberg, 1880)
 Epicauta aterrima (Klug, 1825)
 Epicauta atkinsoni Kraatz, 1880
 Epicauta atomaria (Germar, 1821)
 Epicauta atrata (Fabricius, 1775)
 Epicauta atricolor Champion, 1892
 Epicauta atripilis Champion, 1892
 Epicauta atrivittata (LeConte, 1854)
 Epicauta atropos Pinto, 1991
 Epicauta audouini (Haag-Rutenberg, 1880)
 Epicauta auricomans Champion, 1892
 Epicauta badeni (Haag-Rutenberg, 1880)
 Epicauta balli Werner, 1945
 Epicauta basimacula (Haag-Rutenberg, 1880)
 Epicauta batesii Horn, 1875
 Epicauta beccarii (Haag-Rutenberg, 1880)
 Epicauta beckeri (Dugès, 1889)
 Epicauta bella Mäklin, 1875
 Epicauta bifovieceps Fairmaire, 1897
 Epicauta bimaculatithorax Pic, 1913
 Epicauta bisignata Mäklin, 1875
 Epicauta bispinosa Werner, 1949
 Epicauta bohemani Mäklin, 1875
 Epicauta borgmeieri Denier, 1935
 Epicauta borrei Dugès, 1881
 Epicauta bosqi Denier, 1935
 Epicauta brasilera Selander, 1981
 Epicauta brevipennis (Haag-Rutenberg, 1880)
 Epicauta brevitibialis Kaszab, 1952
 Epicauta bruchi Borchmann, 1930
 Epicauta brunnea Werner, 1944
 Epicauta brunneipennis (Haag-Rutenberg, 1880)
 Epicauta callosa LeConte, 1866
 Epicauta candidata Champion, 1892
 Epicauta canescens (Klug, 1835)
 Epicauta cardui (Dugès, 1869)
 Epicauta carmelita (Haag-Rutenberg, 1880)
 Epicauta castadiva Pinto, 1991
 Epicauta cavernosa Courbon, 1855
 Epicauta caviceps Horn, 1873
 Epicauta cazieri Dillon, 1952
 Epicauta centenaria Breyer y Trant, 1910
 Epicauta centralis Burmeister, 1881
 Epicauta cervina Mäklin, 1875
 Epicauta chalybea (Erichson, 1843)
 Epicauta cheni Tan, 1958
 Epicauta chinensis (Laporte, 1840)
 Epicauta cicatrix Werner, 1951
 Epicauta cinctipennis (Chevrolat, 1834)
 Epicauta cinerea Forster, 1771
 Epicauta cinereiventris Champion, 1892
 Epicauta clericalis (Berg, 1881)
 Epicauta cognata (Haag-Rutenberg, 1880)
 Epicauta compressicollis Champion, 1892
 Epicauta conferta (Say, 1824)
 Epicauta coromandelensis (Haag-Rutenberg, 1880)
 Epicauta corvina (LeConte, 1858)
 Epicauta corybantica Pinto, 1991
 Epicauta costata (LeConte, 1854)
 Epicauta costipennis Borchmann, 1930
 Epicauta courboni (Guérin-Ménéville, 1855)
 Epicauta crassitarsis Maydell, 1935
 Epicauta cribricollis Fairmaire, 1893
 Epicauta croceicincta Dugès, 1881
 Epicauta crucera Selander, 1981
 Epicauta cryptogramaca Yang & Ren, 2006
 Epicauta cupraeola (Dugès, 1869)
 Epicauta curticollis Borchmann, 1930
 Epicauta curvicornis (Haag-Rutenberg, 1880)
 Epicauta curvispina Kaszab, 1952
 Epicauta cyclops Fairmaire, 1891
 Epicauta dalihodi Dvorák, 1996
 Epicauta delicata Mathieu, 1983
 Epicauta desgodinsi Frivaldszky, 1892
 Epicauta diana Pinto, 1991
 Epicauta discolor (Haag-Rutenberg, 1880)
 Epicauta disparilis (Champion, 1892)
 Epicauta distorta (Champion, 1892)
 Epicauta diversicornis Haag-Rutenberg, 1880
 Epicauta diversipubescens Maydell, 1934
 Epicauta divisa (Haag-Rutenberg, 1880)
 Epicauta dohrni (Haag-Rutenberg, 1880)
 Epicauta dongolensis (Laporte de Castelnau in Brullé, 1840)
 Epicauta dubia (Fabricius, 1781)
 Epicauta dusaunlti (Dufour, 1821)
 Epicauta elegantula Péringuey, 1909
 Epicauta emarginata Champion, 1892
 Epicauta emmerichi Pic, 1934
 Epicauta ennsi Werner, 1957
 Epicauta enona Péringuey, 1899
 Epicauta ensiformis Werner, 1944
 Epicauta erythraea Pic, 1911
 Epicauta erythrocephala Pallas, 1776 - type species
 Epicauta evanescens Champion, 1892
 Epicauta excavata (Klug, 1825)
 Epicauta excavatifrons Maydell, 1934
 Epicauta excors (Fall, 1909)
 Epicauta fabricii (LeConte, 1853)
 Epicauta fallax Horn, 1885
 Epicauta fasciceps Walker, 1871
 Epicauta femoralis (Erichson, 1834)
 Epicauta ferruginea Say, 1824
 Epicauta fissilabris (LeConte in Agassiz, 1850)
 Epicauta flabellicornis (Germar, 1817)
 Epicauta flagellaria (Erichson, 1848)
 Epicauta flavocinerea (Blatchley, 1910)
 Epicauta flavogrisea (Haag-Rutenberg, 1880)
 Epicauta flobcina Pinto, 1991
 Epicauta floridensis Werner, 1944
 Epicauta floydwerneri Martínez, 1955
 Epicauta forticornis Haag-Rutenberg, 1880
 Epicauta fortis Werner, 1944
 Epicauta franciscana Denier, 1935
 Epicauta fuliginosa (Olivier, 1795)
 Epicauta fulviceps Mäklin, 1875
 Epicauta fulvipes (Klug, 1825)
 Epicauta fumosa (Germar, 1824)
 Epicauta fumosa Haag-Rutenberg, 1880
 Epicauta funebris Horn, 1873
 Epicauta funesta (Chevrolat, 1834)
 Epicauta gissleri (Horn, 1878)
 Epicauta gorhami (Marseul, 1873)
 Epicauta grammica (Fischer, 1827)
 Epicauta grandiceps (Haag-Rutenberg, 1880)
 Epicauta griseonigra Fairmaire, 1873
 Epicauta griseovittata Haag-Rutenberg, 1880
 Epicauta haagi F. Bates, 1875
 Epicauta haematocephala (Haag-Rutenberg, 1880)
 Epicauta haroldi (Haag-Rutenberg, 1880)
 Epicauta heterodera Horn, 1891
 Epicauta hieroglyphica (Haag-Rutenberg, 1880)
 Epicauta himalayica Kaszab, 1960
 Epicauta hirsutipubescens (Maydell, 1934)
 Epicauta hirticornis (Haag-Rutenberg, 1880)
 Epicauta hirtipes (Waterhouse, 1871)
 Epicauta horaki Dvorák, 1996
 Epicauta horni Champion, 1892
 Epicauta hubbelli Werner, 1973
 Epicauta humeralis (Dugès, 1889)
 Epicauta hydrocephala Fairmaire, 1893
 Epicauta hypoleuca (Klug, 1825)
 Epicauta immaculata (Say, 1824)
 Epicauta impressicornis (Pic, 1913)
 Epicauta impressifrons Van Dyke, 1928
 Epicauta incompleta Fairmaire, 1896
 Epicauta inconstans Fischer de Waldheim, 1827
 Epicauta indiana Kaszab, 1956
 Epicauta ingrata Fall, 1907
 Epicauta insignis Horn, 1885
 Epicauta insularis (Haag-Rutenberg, 1880)
 Epicauta intermedia Haag-Rutenberg, 1880
 Epicauta interrupta (Fairmaire, 1889)
 Epicauta jeanneli Pic, 1913
 Epicauta jeffersi Pinto, 1980
 Epicauta jimenezi Dugès, 1889
 Epicauta jucunda Péringuey, 1888
 Epicauta kansana Werner, 1944
 Epicauta korytkowskii Kaszab, 1978
 Epicauta kraussi (Haag-Rutenberg, 1880)
 Epicauta kwangsiensis Tan, 1958
 Epicauta labialis (Dugès, 1881)
 Epicauta laevicollis Mäklin, 1875
 Epicauta laevicornis Werner, 1973
 Epicauta languida (Horn, 1895)
 Epicauta laticornis (Haag-Rutenberg, 1880)
 Epicauta latitarsis (Haag-Rutenberg, 1880)
 Epicauta lauta (Horn, 1885)
 Epicauta lemniscata (Fabricius, 1801)
 Epicauta leonensis Pic, 1913
 Epicauta leoni Dugès, 1889
 Epicauta leopardina (Haag-Rutenberg, 1880)
 Epicauta leucocoma Champion, 1892
 Epicauta levettei Casey, 1891
 Epicauta liebecki Werner, 1944
 Epicauta linearis (LeConte, 1858)
 Epicauta longicollis (LeConte, 1853)
 Epicauta luctifera (Fairmaire, 1873)
 Epicauta luteolineata Pic, 1933
 Epicauta maculata (Say, 1824)
 Epicauta maculifera (Maydell, 1934)
 Epicauta magnomaculata Martin, 1932
 Epicauta maklini (Haag-Rutenberg, 1880)
 Epicauta mandibularis Anand, 1977
 Epicauta mannerheimi (Mäklin, 1875)
 Epicauta manovana Pic, 1913
 Epicauta mashuna Péringuey, 1899
 Epicauta maura (LeConte, 1851)
 Epicauta megacephala (Champion, 1892)
 Epicauta megalocephala (Gebler, 1817)
 Epicauta melanocephala (Fabricius, 1801)
 Epicauta melanota (Mäklin, 1875)
 Epicauta merkeliana Horn, 1891
 Epicauta mesembryanthemi Péringuey, 1888
 Epicauta mima Péringuey, 1909
 Epicauta mimetica (Horn, 1875)
 Epicauta minutepunctata Borchmann, 1930
 Epicauta missionum (Berg, 1881)
 Epicauta modesta (Haag-Rutenberg, 1880)
 Epicauta moesta Péringuey, 1886
 Epicauta mojiangensis Tan Juanjie, 1993
 Epicauta monachica (Berg, 1883)
 Epicauta montana Anand, 1977
 Epicauta montara Ballmer, 1979
 Epicauta murina (LeConte, 1853)
 Epicauta nattereri (Haag-Rutenberg, 1880)
 Epicauta neglecta (Haag-Rutenberg, 1880)
 Epicauta nepalensis (Hope in Gray, 1831)
 Epicauta nigra Dugés, 1870
 Epicauta nigrans (Mäklin, 1875)
 Epicauta nigritarsis (LeConte, 1853)
 Epicauta nigromarginata (Mäklin, 1875)
 Epicauta nigropunctata (Blanchard, 1843)
 Epicauta niveolineata (Haag-Rutenberg, 1880)
 Epicauta normalis Werner, 1944
 Epicauta notaticollis Péringuey, 1888
 Epicauta nyassensis (Haag-Rutenberg, 1880)
 Epicauta obesa (Chevrolat, 1835)
 Epicauta oblita (LeConte, 1851)
 Epicauta obscureovittata Wellman, 1910
 Epicauta obscuricornis Chevrolet, 1877
 Epicauta obscurocephala Reitter, 1905
 Epicauta occidentalis Werner, 1944
 Epicauta ocellata Dugés, 1869
 Epicauta ochrea (LeConte, 1853)
 Epicauta oculata (Fabricius, 1792)
 Epicauta optata Péringuey, 1892
 Epicauta oregona Horn, 1875
 Epicauta ovampoa Péringuey, 1899
 Epicauta palpalis Kaszab, 1981
 Epicauta pardalis (LeConte, 1866)
 Epicauta parkeri Werner, 1944
 Epicauta parvula (Haldeman, 1854)
 Epicauta pedalis (LeConte, 1866)
 Epicauta pensylvanica (De Geer, 1775)
 Epicauta philaemata (Klug, 1825)
 Epicauta phoenix Werner, 1944
 Epicauta picitarsis Fairmaire, 1885
 Epicauta picta (Laporte, 1840)
 Epicauta pilma (Molina, 1782)
 Epicauta pilsbryi Skinner, 1906
 Epicauta platycera Fairmaire, 1876
 Epicauta pleuralis Fairmaire
 Epicauta pluvialis Borchmann, 1930
 Epicauta polingi Werner, 1944
 Epicauta politicollis Fairmaire, 1893
 Epicauta probsti Dvorák, 1996
 Epicauta prolifica Wellman, 1909
 Epicauta promerotricha Dvorák, 1996
 Epicauta proscripta Pinto, 1980
 Epicauta prosopidis Werner, 1973
 Epicauta pruinosa LeConte, 1866
 Epicauta punctata (Pallas, 1781)
 Epicauta puncticollis Mannerheim, 1843
 Epicauta punctipennis Werner, 1944
 Epicauta punctum Dugés, 1869
 Epicauta punjabensis Saha, 1979
 Epicauta purpurea (Horn, 1885)
 Epicauta purpureiceps (Berg, 1889)
 Epicauta quadraticollis Fairmaire, 1891
 Epicauta rehni Maydell, 1934
 Epicauta reini (Kiesenwetter, 1879)
 Epicauta rileyi Horn, 1874
 Epicauta rubriceps (Redtenbacher, 1842)
 Epicauta rubricollis (Reiche in Ferret & Galin, 1850)
 Epicauta ruficeps (Illiger in Wiedemeyer, 1800)
 Epicauta rufidorsum (Goeze, 1777)
 Epicauta rufifrons Fåhraeus, 1870
 Epicauta rufipedes Dugés, 1870
 Epicauta rufipennis (Chevrolet, 1834)
 Epicauta rufoscutellaris Pic, 1913
 Epicauta rugicollis (Fairmaire, 1887)
 Epicauta ruidosana Fall, 1907
 Epicauta rutilifrons Borchmann, 1930
 Epicauta sanctoruensis Zaragoza-Caballero & Velasco-de Leon, 2003
 Epicauta sanguiniceps (Fairmaire, 1885)
 Epicauta sanguinicollis (LeConte, 1853)
 Epicauta sanguinithorax Haag-Rutenberg, 1880
 Epicauta schneideri Dvorák, 1996
 Epicauta segmenta (Say, 1823)
 Epicauta seminitida Wellman, 1910
 Epicauta semitestacea Fairmaire, 1896
 Epicauta semivittata Fairmaire, 1875
 Epicauta senilis Werner, 1949
 Epicauta seriata Ren & Yang, 2007
 Epicauta sericans LeConte, 1866
 Epicauta sharpi Marseul, 1875
 Epicauta sibirica (Pallas, 1773)
 Epicauta singularis Champion, 1892
 Epicauta sparsicapilla Yang & Ren, 2007
 Epicauta spilotella Péringuey, 1904
 Epicauta spinicornis Pic, 1911
 Epicauta spurcaticollis Fairmaire, 1883
 Epicauta stigmata Dugès, 1869
 Epicauta straba Horn, 1891
 Epicauta strangulata (Gerstaecker, 1854)
 Epicauta strigata (Gyllenhal in Schoenherr, 1817)
 Epicauta strigida Marseul, 1879
 Epicauta strigosa (Gyllenhal in Schoenherr, 1817)
 Epicauta stuarti LeConte, 1868
 Epicauta subatra Dugés, 1889
 Epicauta subglabra (Fall, 1922)
 Epicauta sublineata (LeConte, 1854)
 Epicauta subrubra Dugés, 1886
 Epicauta subvittata (Erichson, 1848)
 Epicauta sulcicollis Mäklin, 1875
 Epicauta suturalis (Germar, 1821)
 Epicauta talpa Haag-Rutenberg, 1880
 Epicauta tamara Adams & Selander, 1979
 Epicauta tarasca Pinto, 1991
 Epicauta temexa Adams & Selander, 1979
 Epicauta tenebrosa Werner, 1949
 Epicauta tenella (LeConte, 1858)
 Epicauta tenuicollis (Pallas, 1782)
 Epicauta tenuicornis (Champion, 1892)
 Epicauta tenuilineata (Horn, 1894)
 Epicauta tenuis (LeConte, 1853)
 Epicauta teresa Mathieu, 1983
 Epicauta terminata Dugés, 1869
 Epicauta testaceipes Fairmaire in Révoil, 1882
 Epicauta tetragramma Haag-Rutenberg, 1880
 Epicauta texana Werner, 1944
 Epicauta textilis (Haag-Rutenberg, 1880)
 Epicauta thailandica Dvorák, 1996
 Epicauta thoracica (Erichson, 1843)
 Epicauta tibialis (Waterhouse, 1871)
 Epicauta tomentosa Mäklin, 1875
 Epicauta torsa (LeConte, 1853)
 Epicauta trichrus (Pallas, 1798)
 Epicauta tricostata (Werner, 1943)
 Epicauta tripartita Champion, 1892
 Epicauta tristis (Mäklin, 1875)
 Epicauta unicalcarata Champion, 1892
 Epicauta uniforma Werner, 1944
 Epicauta unilineata Champion, 1891
 Epicauta valida (LeConte, 1853)
 Epicauta velata (Gerstaecker, 1854)
 Epicauta ventralis Werner, 1945
 Epicauta vicina Haag-Rutenberg, 1880
 Epicauta vidua (Klug, 1825)
 Epicauta villipes Haag-Rutenberg, 1880
 Epicauta virgulata (LeConte, 1866)
 Epicauta viridipennis Burmeister, 1865
 Epicauta vittata (Fabricius, 1775)
 Epicauta vitticollis (Haag-Rutenberg, 1880)
 Epicauta vittulata Borehmann, 1917
 Epicauta waterhousei (Haag-Rutenberg, 1880)
 Epicauta weixiensis Tan, 1992
 Epicauta wellmani Kaszab, 1956
 Epicauta westermanni Mäklin, 1875
 Epicauta weyrauchii Kaszab, 1960
 Epicauta wheeleri Horn, 1873
 Epicauta willei Denier, 1940
 Epicauta wittmeri Kaszab, 1978
 Epicauta xanthocephala (Klug, 1825)
 Epicauta xanthomeros (Fischer, 1827)
 Epicauta xantusi Kaszab, 1952
 Epicauta yungana Denier, 1935
 Epicauta zebra (Dohrn, 1876)
 Epicauta zischakai Martínez, 1955

References

Further reading
 Campos-Soldini, M. P. (2011). A new species group of the genus Epicauta Dejean of southern South America, the bella group (Coleoptera: Meloidae). Neotropical Entomology 40(5), 575-86.

Meloidae